Nester may refer to:

 Nester Township, Michigan
 Nester (character), the long-time teenage mascot and comic strip star of Nintendo Power magazine

See also 
 Nestor (disambiguation)